Pulavanchi is a village located in Madukkur Panchayat Union, Pattukkottai Taluk, in the Thanjavur District, of the Indian state of Tamil Nadu.

The name Pulavanchi is derived from a combination of pulamai (the name talent) and vanchi (woman), named after people who used to occupy the area. Now, the population is primarily Vellalar, Kallar, Aachariyar, Thevar, Naadar. Paraiyar castes are dalits

Kalyanaodai Vaikal splits from Puthu Aru Vaikal that too is separated from Kaveri River by Kallanai Dam rivers. The village is surrounded by fields of crops and coconut trees. There are also many ponds and a large lake. The village is one of 15 selected for the Tamil Nadu Green Village Award.

Ration Shop: under public distribution system - Madukkur Panchyath Union General Distribution Center. Thanjavur District Co-Operative General Distribution Services Limited Post Office

The village is also one of the 36 constituency villages of Musukunda Nadu. In 2018,this village  was attacked by a cyclone named Kaja. More than 2,000 coconut trees were destroyed. The cyclone had also attacked nearby villages. In response, the government allocated funds.

References

Villages in Thanjavur district